The tram route 19 in Brussels, Belgium is a tram route operated by the STIB, which connects the Flemish town of Groot-Bijgaarden in the municipality of Dilbeek to the De Wand stop in Laeken in the municipality of the City of Brussels. 

Starting from the Groot-Bijgaarden railway station in Dilbeek, the route then stops at the Bayens roundabout and then enters the Brussels-Capital Region via the Brusselstraat. The first stop in Brussels is at Hunderenveld in the municipality of Sint-Agatha-Berchem. The route then runs along the Avenue du Roi Albert/Koning Albertlaan up to the Dr. Schweitzer square, the Avenue Josse Goffin/Josse Goffinlaan and the Avenue de l'Hôpital Français/Frans Gasthuislaan where it enters the municipality of Koekelberg. The route then runs along the Basilica of the Sacred Heart and the Elisabeth park on the Avenue du Panthéon/Pantheonlaan and then on the Avenue de la Liberté/Vrijheidslaan up to the Simonis metro station. At Simonis the route turns left on the Avenue de Jette/Jetselaan and then enters the municipality of Jette. At the Queen Astrid square the route heads towards the Jette railway station via the Rue Léon Théodor/Léon Théodorstraat, then runs around the Jette cemetery via the Rue Jules Lahaye/Jules Lahayestraat and enters the Boulevard de Smet de Naeyer/De Smet de Naeyerlaan. Further on this boulevard, the route enters the borough of Laeken in the City of Brussels and then connects again with the Brussels Metro at the Stuyvenbergh metro station. The route finally runs along the Avenue des Robiniers/Witte Acacialaan and Avenue Jean Sobieski/Jan Sobieskilaan and then crosses the Laeken park by entering a tunnel which ends at the other end of the Laeken park at the De Wand stop.

See also
 List of Brussels tram routes

References

External links
STIB/MIVB official website

19
City of Brussels
Dilbeek
Jette
Koekelberg
Sint-Agatha-Berchem
1968 establishments in Belgium